Operation Ashura is a military operation during Iran-Iraq War which was launched on 17 October 1984 by Islamic Revolutionary Guard Corps and Islamic Republic of Iran Army against the army of Iraq. The military code of this operation was "Ya Aba Abdullah Al-Hussein (A.S.)" [Persian: (یااباعبدالله‌الحسین(ع], and ultimately the operation led to the recapture of more than 50 square kilometers of occupied areas in Ilam province, Iran.

Twelve days before the official start of the Iran-Iraq war, on September 10, 1980, Iraqi Ba'athist army entered Ilam province and occupied the Meymak area. As a result of Ashura-operation, Iran took back fifty square-kilometers of the area, and Iranian forces killed/injured about 1500 of Iraqi forces, and captured 190 members from Iraqi army. Among the spoils of war achievement by Iran, are as follows:

4 tanks, 7 vehicles, 6 106 mm rifles, 29 mortars and a large number of small arms and ammunition from the Iraqi army.

See also 
 Operation Dawn 3
 Operation Karbala 1
 Operation Dawn 1
 Operation Muharram
 Operation Forty Stars

References 

Military operations of the Iran–Iraq War
Iran–Iraq War
Battles involving Iran
Battles involving Iraq